Wilzen may refer to:

the German exonym for the Veleti group of West Slavic tribes.
the German exonym for the town of Vilce, Latvia.